General elections were held in Nicaragua on 3 February 1957 to elect a president and National Congress.

Results

Notes

References

Further reading
Gambone, Michael D. Capturing the revolution: the United States, Central America, and Nicaragua, 1961-1972. Westport: Praeger. 2001.
González, Victoria . “Somocista women, right-wing politics, and feminism in Nicaragua, 1936-1979.” Radical women in Latin America: left and right. 2001. University Park: The Pennsylvania State University. Revised edition of González 1997.
Martz, John D. Central America, the crisis and the challenge. Chapel Hill: the University of North Carolina Press. 1959.
Metoyer, Cynthia Chavez. Women and the state in post-Sandinista Nicaragua. Boulder: Lynne Rienner Publishers, Inc. 2000.
Millett, Richard. Guardians of the dynasty: a history of the U.S. created Guardia Nacional de Nicaragua and the Somoza Family. Maryknoll: Orbis Books. 1977.
Parker, Franklin D. The Central American republics. Westport: Greenwood Press. Reprint of 1964 original. 1981.
Political handbook of the world 1958. New York, 1959.
Tenorio, Gloria Esther and Mercedes Ríos Rocha. La participación política de las mujeres en el proceso electoral 1996. Managua: Instituto de Investigaciones Mujer y Cambio.

Elections in Nicaragua
Nicaragua
1957 in Nicaragua
Presidential elections in Nicaragua
Election and referendum articles with incomplete results